The Howlin' Brothers are a Nashville-based old-time country blues/string band consisting of singer/songwriters Ian Craft (fiddle, mandolin, banjo, and kick-drum), Jared Green (guitar, harmonica, and piano), and Dan Swan (upright bass). They were described by  AllMusic as "an Americana string band, but a reconfigured 21st century version, incorporating rock, pop, gospel, jazz, R&B, Dixieland, country blues, and who knows what else into the mix."

History 

Craft, Green, met while attending Ithaca College.  They discovered a mutual love of traditional and roots music, and formed The Howlin' Brothers in 2003. After developing a following in Ithaca, the Howlin' Brothers relocated to Nashville, where they self-released their debut album, Mountain Songs, in 2007; and meeting Jt Huskey shortly after.  After independently releasing three additional albums, the Howlin' Brothers were introduced by a mutual friend to producer/musician Brendan Benson, who signed them to his label, Readymade.  Benson produced the band's 2013 release, Howl, which featured appearances from Jypsi and Warren Haynes.   The album was critically acclaimed, and The Howlin' Brothers launched a successful tour in the US and Canada.  In May, 2014, the band released their second Benson-produced record on Readymade, Trouble, which Rolling Stone called a "rip-roarin', hootenanny on wax that puts a rocked-out spin on old-timey bluegrass."

Discography 
2017 Cannonball
2014 Trouble  Readymade Records 
2013 The  Sun Studio Session (EP) 	
2013 Howl Readymade Records 
2012 Old Time All The Time  (Live compilation) 
2011 Baker Street Blues
2009 Long Hard Year
2007 Mountain Blues

References

External links 
 The Howlin' Brothers 

Americana music groups
Country blues musicians
Musical groups established in 2003